A New White is the first studio album by American hip hop sextet Subtle. It was released on Lex Records in 2004. "F.K.O." and "The Long Vein of the Law" were released as singles from the album. The album peaked at number 55 on the CMJ Top 200 chart, as well as number 10 on CMJ's RPM chart.

Critical reception
Brian Howe of Pitchfork gave the album a 7.8 out of 10, describing it as "an chimera cobbled together from live and programmed drums, electronic strings, keyboards, samplers, guitars, woodwinds, and Doseone's chameleonic flows." Lee Henderson of PopMatters gave the album 7 stars out of 10, saying, "Subtle provides you with some of Doseone's best lyrics and art since his work with Boom Bip, accompanied by some of the best compositions anyone has created from the Anticon unit all told."

Track listing

Personnel
Credits adapted from liner notes.

Subtle
 Dax Pierson – keyboards, sampler, melodica
 Alexander Kort – electric cello, acoustic cello, electric bass, acoustic bass
 Jordan Dalrymple – drums, guitar, sampler
 Jeffrey "Jel" Logan – drum machine
 Marty Kalani Dowers – woodwinds, synthesizer
 Adam "Doseone" Drucker – words, vocals, synthesizer, artwork

Additional musicians
 J. Goody – trumpet (on "Song Meat")

Technical personnel
 Subtle – recording, mixing
 J. Goody – recording, mixing

References

External links
 

2004 debut albums
Subtle (band) albums
Lex Records albums